The Butuan Silver Palaeograph, also known as the Butuan Silver Strip, is a piece of metal with inscriptions found in Butuan, Agusan province in mid-1970s by a team of archaeologists from the National Museum of the Philippines. Treasure hunters who were looking for old ceramics and gold ornaments discovered this metal strip inside a wooden coffin. Coffins of the same type, dating back to the 14th and 15th centuries, were found at the site. According to Jesus Peralta, found inside were human remains with artificially deformed skulls - a practice in this region limited to Southern Philippines and unpopular in Luzon.

Due to the similarities found between the coffins, it is reasonable for archaeologists to assume that the latter came from that same era. Debate, however, arose regarding the origin of the said artifact, but until now, it is considered to belong to Butuan where it was found. Boechari of Indonesia, said Peralta, identified the writings as very close to a Javanese script that existed from the 12th to the 15th century. This yet-to-be-deciphered Butuan palaeograph is now in the hands of Proceso Gonzales, the city engineer of Butuan.

References

1970s archaeological discoveries
Archaeological artifacts
Archaeology of the Philippines
Butuan
History of Agusan del Norte
Inscriptions in undeciphered writing systems
Philippine scripts